Lachlan Ross (born 12 August 1973) is a former Australian rules footballer who played with Essendon in the Australian Football League (AFL) and West Adelaide in the South Australian National Football League (SANFL).

External links

1973 births
Living people
Essendon Football Club players
West Adelaide Football Club players
Indigenous Australian players of Australian rules football
Australian rules footballers from South Australia